The Quartermaster Award is the highest rank attainable in the Sea Scouting program of the Boy Scouts of America.

Award
The award consists of a medal suspended from a blue ribbon; the ribbon is suspended from a silver-colored bar bearing the design of a double carrick bend knot. The medal is a silver ship's wheel with a compass inscribed inside the wheel and bearing the Sea Scouting emblem consisting of the universal BSA insignia superimposed on an anchor.

The blue stands for the loyalty to country; the compass suggests the importance of a carefully chosen direction in life; the wheel reminds Sea Scouts that they are the guides of their own future; the anchor reminds the Sea Scout that a truly worthy life must be anchored in duty to God.

The badge is a cloth patch bearing the wheel and compass emblem on a blue background with a silver border. Recipients may wear the corresponding square knot insignia, with a white knot on a blue background on the BSA uniform.

Requirements
After completing all previous ranks, Apprentice, Ordinary, and Able, the Sea Scout can earn the Quartermaster Award.
 Ideals: Must lead a discussion on "the Sea Promise" and submit a report on improvements regarding the ship's program.
 Membership: Meet the active membership requirements of your ship for six months. Present a talk on Sea Scouting.
 Leadership: Plan and carry out a service Project and an overnight cruise. Serve as a ship's officer for six months and conduct ILSS training for your ship.
Special Skills: Complete the 8 special skills required for Quartermaster, which include:
 Swimming 
 Safety
 Marlinspike Seamanship
 Boat Handling 
 Ground Tackle
 Navigation
 Weather
 Environment 
 Electives: Complete four of the level three electives in: leadership, a duty to god, sailing, paddling, vessels, racing, engine, vessel maintenance, electricity, rigging, special proficiency, ornamental ropework, maritime traditions, the United States Coast Guard Auxiliary, or United States Power Squadrons.

After completion of requirements, the Sea Scout needs to receive approval from the Skipper, typically by a conference, the Quarterdeck, by the Boatswain at the Quarterdeck Meeting, the Ship Committee, and the Council Advancement Committee by Bridge of Review.

Origins
It is currently unknown when the Quartermaster Award was introduced, however, the first recorded Quartermaster was in May 1929.  On December 12, 1930, the Quartermaster badge was approved by the National Executive board. It cost $3.00. Extensive changes to advancement requirements were made in October 1938 by the National Sea Scouting Committee.  On September 1, 1949, Sea Exploring was created.  The only change in name was from Sea Scouts to Sea Explorers or Quartermaster Explorers.

Highest awards in other programs

The Quartermaster Award  is the highest award in Sea Scouting. The highest awards in other BSA membership divisions are: Cub Scouting Arrow of Light, the Boy Scouts’ Eagle Scout and the Venturing Summit Award, Other Scouting movements and many non-Scouting organizations have similar programs and awards.

References

Advancement and recognition in the Boy Scouts of America
Sea Scouting